Kaikalur Assembly constituency is a constituency in Eluru district of Andhra Pradesh, representing the state legislative assembly in India. It is one of the seven assembly segments of Eluru (Lok Sabha constituency), along with Unguturu, Denduluru, Eluru, Polavaram, Chintalapudi and Nuzvid.  Dulam Nageswara Rao is the present MLA of the constituency, who won the 2019 Andhra Pradesh Legislative Assembly election from YSR Congress Party. , there are a total of 195,782 electors in the constituency.

Mandals 
The four mandals that form the assembly constituency are:

Members of Legislative Assembly Kaikalur

Election results

Assembly elections 1952

Assembly Elections 2004

Assembly Elections 2009

Assembly elections 2014

Assembly elections 2019

See also 
 List of constituencies of the Andhra Pradesh Legislative Assembly

References 

Assembly constituencies of Andhra Pradesh